Alectryon connatus, sometimes named hairy alectryon, is a species of small trees, constituting part of the plant family Sapindaceae.

They grow naturally in Australia, in eastern Queensland from the south-east to the northernmost Cape York Peninsula, Western Australia, perhaps in north-eastern New South Wales, and in New Guinea. They grow in littoral rainforests, vine thickets, tropical monsoon forests (seasonal rainforests) and similar vegetation assemblages, in the lowlands, and in the tropics the uplands recorded up to  altitude.

Naming and classification
European science formally described the species under the name Spanoghea connata in 1859, authored by German–Australian botanist Ferdinand von Mueller.

In 1878, Bavarian botanist Ludwig A. T. Radlkofer formally renamed this species to Alectryon connatus.

Description

References

connatus
Flora of Queensland
Rosids of Western Australia
Flora of Papua New Guinea
Taxa named by Ferdinand von Mueller